Calathus luctuosus is a species of ground beetle from the Platyninae subfamily that can be found in Andorra, France, Portugal and Spain.

References

luctuosus
Beetles described in 1804
Beetles of Europe